Ulla Margarete Dinger (born 1955) is a Swedish mathematician specializing in mathematical analysis. She was the first woman to earn a doctorate in mathematics at the University of Gothenburg.

Dinger completed her doctorate at the University of Gothenburg in 1989. Her dissertation, On the ball problem and the Laguerre maximal operators, was jointly supervised by Christer Borell (of the Borell–Brascamp–Lieb inequality) and Peter Sjögren.

She is a senior lecturer in mathematics at the Chalmers University of Technology, where she teaches real analysis and heads the program for the Preparatory Year in Natural Sciences.

References

1955 births
Living people
Swedish mathematicians
Women mathematicians
University of Gothenburg alumni
Academic staff of the Chalmers University of Technology